Stefan Ruzowitzky (born 25 December 1961) is an Austrian film director and screenwriter.

Early life
Ruzowitzky was born in Vienna. He studied drama and history at the University of Vienna and started directing music videos, for example for 'N Sync, and commercials.

Movie career
In 1996, Ruzowitzky presented his first feature film, Tempo, about a group of youths living in Vienna. He was subsequently awarded with the Max Ophüls Preis. His next feature film, The Inheritors, set in the rural Mühlviertel in Upper Austria, came out in 1998, and was awarded Best Picture at the Rotterdam film festival as well as at the Flanders Film Festival. It also got a prize at the International Film Festival in Valladolid.

In 2000 he directed the successful German horror film Anatomy, starring Franka Potente, and in 2003 the equally well received sequel Anatomy 2. Between those two Ruzowitzky's first international co-production All the Queen's Men from 2001, starring Matt LeBlanc and Eddie Izzard, was received poorly by both critics and viewers.

In 2007 Ruzowitzky's The Counterfeiters premiered at the Berlin International Film Festival and was nominated for a Golden Bear award. The film is based on the memories of Adolf Burger, a Jewish Slovak typographer and Holocaust survivor involved in Operation Bernhard. The Counterfeiters, nominated on behalf of Austrian cinema, won the Oscar for Best Foreign Language Film at the 80th Academy Awards on 24 February 2008.

In 2013, he directed the 90-minute non-fiction drama Das radikal Böse which by means of authentic letters and interviewing psychology, military, and history experts seeks to explain the mentality of 'ordinary' members of Einsatzgruppen and Wehrmacht soldiers that carried out the Holocaust, mainly based upon Christopher Browning's 1992 book Ordinary Men which assigns the efficiency of the German killing machinery to social mechanisms of conformism and peer pressure rather than racial hatred.

He is currently working on the vampire horror film The Last Voyage of the Demeter, which is based on Bram Stoker's Dracula tale, and the psychological thriller Braincopy.

On 2 May 2014, Deadline Hollywood announced that Ruzowitzky will direct Screen Gems' action-thriller Patient Zero based on an original script by Mike Le.  The film stars Matt Smith and Natalie Dormer.

Filmography

1996 – Tempo – writer & director
1998 – The Inheritors – writer & director
2000 – Anatomy – writer & director
2001 – All the Queen's Men – director
2003 – Anatomy 2 – writer & director
2007 – The Counterfeiters – writer & director
2009 – Lilly the Witch: The Dragon and the Magic Book – writer & director
2012 – Deadfall – director
2017 – Cold Hell – director
2017 – Patient Zero – director
2019 - 8 Tage - director
2020: - Narziss und Goldmund - director 
2021: – Hinterland – director

Oscar
2007 – The Counterfeiters for Best Foreign Language Film (won)

Opera
In 2010, Ruzowitzky directed his first opera production, Der Freischütz, for Vienna's Theater an der Wien. The cast included his Counterfeiters-star Karl Markovics in the non-singing role of Samiel, the production was conducted by Bertrand de Billy.

References

External links

1961 births
Austrian film directors
Austrian screenwriters
Austrian male screenwriters
English-language film directors
Living people
Film people from Vienna
Directors of Best Foreign Language Film Academy Award winners